Français Glacier Tongue is a broad glacier tongue about  long extending seaward from Français Glacier. It was charted in 1951 by the French Antarctic Expedition and named by them for the Français, expedition ship of the French Antarctic Expedition, 1903–05, under Jean-Baptiste Charcot.

References

Ice tongues of Antarctica
Bodies of ice of Adélie Land